United Nations Security Council Resolution 36, adopted on November 1, 1947, noted that according to a report by the Consular Commission, no attempt has been made by either side (the Netherlands and Indonesian Republicans) in the Indonesian National Revolution to come to compliance with United Nations Security Council Resolution 27.  The resolution called upon the parties concerned to take action to bring the resolution into effect.

The resolution was approved by seven votes to one against (from Poland) and three abstentions from Colombia, Syria and the Soviet Union.

See also
List of United Nations Security Council Resolutions 1 to 100 (1946–1953)

References
Text of the Resolution at undocs.org

External links
 

 0036
Indonesian National Revolution
 0036
 0036
1947 in Indonesia
1947 in the Netherlands
November 1947 events